Gouding was a monarchical state that lasted approximately 400 years, from 111 BC to 316 AD, and was centered on Guangnan County in modern-day Wenshan Zhuang and Miao Autonomous Prefecture, Yunnan province, China.

In December 2015, artifacts unearthed from Gouding were on display at the Guangnan Minorities Museum.

See also
Đông Sơn drums
Neighbouring kingdoms of Dian and Yelang.
Southward expansion of the Han dynasty
Zomia (geography)

References

Former countries in Chinese history
Ancient peoples of China
History of Yunnan
Wenshan Zhuang and Miao Autonomous Prefecture
Archaeological artifacts of China